Edward Twichell Ware (1874 - May 19, 1927) was the third president of Atlanta University from 1907 to 1919.  Ware graduated from Yale College in 1897 and returned to Atlanta University to help in fundraising efforts.  Students perceived Ware as being different from other white people, because he extended common courtesies to black students.

References

External links

Educators from Georgia (U.S. state)
Clark Atlanta University faculty
Yale College alumni
1874 births
1927 deaths
People from Atlanta